Thung Kha railway station is a railway station located in Thung Kha Subdistrict, Chumphon City, Chumphon.

Train services 
 Ordinary No. 254/255 Lang Suan-Thon Buri-Lang Suan
 Local No. 445/446 Chumphon-Hat Yai Junction-Chumphon

References 
 
 

Railway stations in Thailand